Petru Vladimir Bălan (born 12 July 1976, in Suceava) is a Romanian retired rugby union footballer who played as a prop.

Before moving to play rugby in France he played for Dinamo Bucharest in Romania, including playing for them in the 1998–99 European Challenge Cup. He played for FC Grenoble in the 2002–04 Challenge Cup and European Shield competitions. He moved to Biarritz for the 2003–04 season. He was a part of the team that won the 2004–05 Top 16 and the 2005–06 Top 14. Also with Biaritz Olimpique were runners-up to Munster in the 2005–06 Heineken Cup.

He was a part of the Romanian team at the 2003 Rugby World Cup, playing two matches throughout the tournament held in Australia.

On 14 March 2008 Bălan signed for Northampton Saints in the Guinness Premiership. He was expected to join the club for the 2008–09 season, but back problems led to his contract being voided. After finishing the season with Biarritz, Bălan was idle until he signed a two-year contract with Fédérale 1 club Saint-Jean-de-Luz.

Honours
Club
Dinamo Bucharest
SuperLiga
Champion: 1999–00, 2000–01
Romanian Cup
Winner: 1999–00, 2000–01

Grenoble
Pro D2
Runner-up: 2001–02

Biarritz 
 Top 14
 Champion: 2004–05, 2005–06
 Heineken Cup
Runner-up: 2005–06

Timișoara
SuperLiga
 Champion: 2011–12

International
Romania
European Nations Cup (3): 2000, 2001–02, 2004–06

External links
 Petru Balan on ercrugby.com
 Petru Balan on rwc2003.irb.com

1976 births
Living people
Sportspeople from Suceava
Romanian rugby union players
Rugby union props
CS Dinamo București (rugby union) players
FC Grenoble players
Biarritz Olympique players
US Dax players
CA Brive players
SCM Rugby Timișoara players
Romania international rugby union players
Romanian expatriate rugby union players
Expatriate rugby union players in France
Romanian expatriate sportspeople in France